Burmese Malays (Jawi: ملايو ميانمار, Pashu), primarily live in Tanintharyi Region in the southern part of Myanmar. 
There are some dispersed Malay from the northernmost states of Malaysia and from southern Thailand. They are believed to be of Kedahan Malay descent.  Some of the Moken people in the Mergui Archipelago speak a dialect of Malay. 

In 1865, an Arab-Malay group led by Nayuda Ahmed, traveling and collecting sea products around Mergui Archipelago settled down in Victoria Point Bay, now located in modern-day Kawthaung, which commenced the first wave of migration from Kedah. The Burmese Malays mainly live in Bokpyin Township and a few islands in the southern part of the Mergui Archipelago.

The Malay influence is clearly visible in the names of certain settlements near Kawthaung - the words Kampong, Ulu, Telok, Tengah and Pulau (Malay words for village, remote, bay, central and island respectively) appear in a handful of settlement names. 

In the 1917 Ethnological Survey of Burma, there are 6,368 individuals identified as Malays.

Language, culture and religion
The Malays living in Southern Burma are related to the Kedahan Malay and maintain strong kinship, cultural and economic links to the northwest coast of Peninsular Malaysia (Kedah, Penang, Perlis) and Southern Thailand (especially among the Malays in Ranong, Krabi and Phuket) till today. They speak Burmese and the Kedah-Perlis dialect. Due to the prevalence of Islamic religious schooling among the community, many of these Malays can also read the Jawi script which was the old Arabic-derived script used in the Malay Peninsula.

Most Malays are adherents of the Shafi'i madhab of Sunni Islam. The Mokens, although related to the Malays, have their own Austronesian languages and a separate cultural, societal and religious identity.

A sizable wave of return migration from Myanmar in 1980s has also resulted in a large settlement of Burmese Malay community that is concentrated in Bukit Malut, Langkawi, Kedah. The present-day population is estimated to be around 8,000 individuals.

The 10,000 residents of Bukit Malut are essentially Malays and not ethnic Rohingya migrants, according to Langkawi Member of Parliament Tun Dr Mahathir Mohamad. They were actually nomadic Malays who migrated to Thailand and Myanmar before moving back and settled in Langkawi. They all speak Malay well.
Nearly 80% of them are fishermen who rely on marine life for a living, supplying fish to Langkawi and as far as Kelantan. They are self-sufficient.

See also
Malays (ethnic group), the ethnic group located primarily in the Malay peninsula, and parts of Sumatra and Borneo
Malay race, a racial category encompassing the people of South East Asia and sometimes the Pacific Islands
Overseas Malays, people of Malay ancestry living outside Malaysia and neighbouring ethnic Malay home areas
Islam in Myanmar

References

Malay diaspora
Malay people
Ethnic groups in Myanmar
Ethnic groups in Thailand